Peter Willey (born 6 December 1949) is a former English cricketer, who played as a right-handed batsman and right-arm offbreak bowler. In and out of the England team, he interrupted his international career for three years by taking part in the first of the England players' South African rebel tours in 1982. After his playing career ended, he became a Test umpire.

Playing career
As his career developed, Willey became a leading exponent of the "open stance" style of batting, where the batsman looks squarely at the bowler, rather than the traditional "side-on" style, looking past his own shoulder at the bowler.

Willey made his debut for Northamptonshire aged 16 in 1966, moving to Leicestershire later in his career. He helped Northamptonshire win the Gillette Cup in 1976, and Leicestershire to win the Benson and Hedges Cup in 1985, in both cases winning the man of the match award.

He was called up by England and given a Test debut against the West Indies in 1976.
Known for his intimidating and moody image, and his ability to score runs off fast bowlers, he was frequently picked against the formidable West Indian pace attack, only to be dropped again for games against more gentle opposition. In all, 15 of his 26 Tests and 13 of his 26 one-day internationals came against the West Indies, all but two of the remaining Tests coming against Australia. He scored two hundreds against the West Indies, although his overall Test batting average ended at under 27.

His first test hundred came in extraordinary fashion when, in partnership with Bob Willis he saved a test match at the Oval in 1980 which had appeared lost with an unbroken last-wicket partnership of 117. His second Test century, and his highest Test score, 102 not out, came in Antigua that winter. Partly because so many of his Test matches came against the West Indies, who never lost a Test to England in his era, it was his nineteenth Test before he finished on the winning side, in the famous victory at Headingley in 1981 against Australia. In 1985 he was restored to the Test team after joining the rebel tour of 1982, and participated in another tour of the West Indies that winter, playing his final Test in 1986.

While his off-spin was less successful in Test cricket, by the time his playing career ended in 1992 he had compiled over 1,000 wickets in first-class cricket and List A cricket combined, to go with over 35,000 runs, including match figures of 12/138 for T.N. Pearce's XI against the touring New Zealanders in 1978.

Umpiring career
Upon his retirement from playing cricket, Willey became an umpire, becoming responsible for international Test Matches in 1996. However, he declined an offer to join the Elite Panel of ICC Umpires in 2001 when it was established, citing family reasons.  Willey continued to umpire Test matches in England until 2015, when he turned 65. ECB policy requires all umpires to retire when they reach this age, in order to allow younger umpires to gain employment. Willey and fellow Northamptonshire team-mate and umpire George Sharp challenged this decision at an employment tribunal, alleging age discrimination on the part of the ECB, but lost their case.

Personal life
Willey is married, and has two children, including David Willey who plays for Yorkshire County Cricket Club and the England cricket team, and two grandchildren.

Anecdotes
According to an urban myth, it was during a Test match between the West Indies and England, when Michael Holding was about to bowl to Willey, that the radio commentator Brian Johnston said: "The bowler's Holding, the batsman's Willey".  While Wisden  stated that there is no record of Johnston or anyone else actually saying this, Johnston's co-commentator, Henry Blofeld, recalled the incident as having taken place at The Oval in 1976. The story is sometimes told the other way around, with Willey bowling to Holding: however, Willey did not bowl to Holding in that particular match.

In 1979, Willey caught Dennis Lillee off the bowling of Graham Dilley, resulting in a scorecard entry of: "Lillee, c. Willey, b. Dilley".

See also
 List of Test cricket umpires
 List of One Day International cricket umpires

References

External links
 

1949 births
Living people
English Test cricket umpires
English One Day International cricket umpires
England One Day International cricketers
England Test cricketers
Leicestershire cricketers
Leicestershire cricket captains
Northamptonshire cricketers
English cricketers
People from Sedgefield
Cricketers from County Durham
Marylebone Cricket Club cricketers
Northumberland cricketers
D. H. Robins' XI cricketers
T. N. Pearce's XI cricketers